Ikaros Bigi (born 27 August 1947) is a German theoretical physicist. His research focuses on refining the Standard Model phenomenology.

Biography
Bigi graduated from Gymnasium Fridericianum, Erlangen, in 1967.  Six years later he received a Master from the Max-Planck-Institute for Physics, University of Munich, where he stayed until 1977 to finish his PhD in Theoretical Physics. Since 1984 he is also a holder of Habilitation degree in Physics, acquired from RWTH Aachen University.

During his career, Bigi has been a research associate in many research teams in laboratories for Physics around the world. To summarize, some of them were SLAC (1973-1974), the Max Planck Institute for Physics in Munich (1975-1981), CERN (1978-1980), the Fermilab (1984). He has also been a visiting professor to universities over the U.S. and Europe, with duties currently being performed for the University of Notre Dame, Indiana.

Bigi is an enthusiastic writer and reviewer with plenty of contributions to scientific journals; he is a member of International Committees and organisations for Physics, taking active part in seminars and conferences held worldwide.

Bigi is married and has three children.

Awards
Along with Anthony Ichiro Sanda, he was awarded the 2004 Sakurai Prize for his work on CP violation and B meson decays.

References

External links
 Faculty page at Notre Dame University

Scientific publications of Ikaros Bigi on INSPIRE-HEP

1947 births
People associated with CERN
20th-century German physicists
J. J. Sakurai Prize for Theoretical Particle Physics recipients
Living people
Theoretical physicists
University of Notre Dame faculty
21st-century German physicists